Samantha McCarthy is an English actress who is best known for the role Elaine Marsden in UK soap opera Emmerdale.

McCarthy was born in Crumpsall, Manchester on 25 November 1985.

McCarthy has also appeared in BBC soap Doctors, in which she played a confused teenager, and CITVs children's show Girls In Love. McCarthy will guest star in an episodes of Jimmy McGovern's The Street on the BBC and ITV's Heartbeat.

McCarthy appeared in the UK film Awaydays released in 2009.

External links
 
 Away Days official page

Actresses from Manchester
1985 births
Living people
People from Crumpsall